The Spa of Our Lady of Palma and the Royal (Spanish: Balneario de Nuestra Señora de la Palma y del Real) is a spa located in Cádiz, Spain. It was declared Bien de Interés Cultural in 1990.

See also 
 List of Bien de Interés Cultural in the Province of Cádiz

References

External links 

Buildings and structures in Cádiz
Bien de Interés Cultural landmarks in the Province of Cádiz